Heinrich Krause (9 June 1885 – 30 July 1983) was an Austrian painter. His work was part of the art competitions at the 1936 Summer Olympics and the 1948 Summer Olympics.

References

1885 births
1983 deaths
20th-century Austrian painters
Austrian male painters
Olympic competitors in art competitions
Artists from Vienna
20th-century Austrian male artists